Acianthera sulcata is a species of orchid plant native to Brazil.

References 

sulcata
Flora of Brazil